Breedlove v. Suttles, 302 U.S. 277 (1937), is an overturned United States Supreme Court decision which upheld the constitutionality of requiring the payment of a poll tax in order to vote in state elections.

Background
At the relevant time, Georgia imposed a poll tax of $1.00 per year, levied generally on all inhabitants. The statute exempted from the tax all persons under 21 or over 60 years of age, and all females who do not register for voting. Under the state constitution, the tax must be paid by the person liable, together with arrears, before he can be registered for voting.

Nolan Breedlove, a white male, 28 years of age, declined to pay the tax, and was not allowed to register to vote.  He filed a lawsuit challenging the Georgia law under the Fourteenth (both the Equal Protection Clause and the Privileges and Immunities Clause) and the Nineteenth amendments.  T. Earl Suttles was named defendant in the case in his official capacity as tax collector of Fulton County, Georgia.

Opinion of the Court

Associate Justice Pierce Butler delivered the opinion of the court, which unanimously upheld the Georgia law.

With respect to the differential treatment of men and women under the law, the court held that differences between women and men allowed for special consideration to be given to women:

With respect to the age discrimination claim, the court held that the upper age limit to the tax was similar to exemptions by age given for military or jury service.

With respect to the Nineteenth Amendment, which states that "The right of citizens of the United States to vote shall not be denied or abridged by the United States or by any State on account of sex", the court dismissed the notion that the purpose of the tax was "to deny or abridge the right of men to vote on account of their sex", and denied the claim as a result.

Subsequent developments
Georgia abolished its poll tax in 1945.

This decision remained precedent until 1966, when the Supreme Court reversed it in a 6–3 decision in Harper v. Virginia State Board of Elections. Two years earlier, the 24th Amendment had been ratified, prohibiting the use of the poll tax (or any other tax) as a precondition for voting in federal elections.  Justice Hugo Black, who participated both in the Breedlove decision and in the Harper decision, dissented from the Harper decision declaring the poll tax to be unconstitutional.

See also
 List of United States Supreme Court cases, volume 302

References

External links
 
 

Overruled United States Supreme Court decisions
History of voting rights in the United States
United States equal protection case law
United States Fourteenth Amendment case law
United States Nineteenth Amendment case law
United States Supreme Court cases
1937 in United States case law
African-American history between emancipation and the civil rights movement
Civil rights movement case law
Georgia (U.S. state) elections
African-American history of Georgia (U.S. state)
Fulton County, Georgia
United States Supreme Court cases of the Hughes Court